William or Bill Cole may refer to:

Business 
 William Rossa Cole (1919–2000), American children's writer
 William Washington Cole (1847–1915), part owner of the Barnum & Bailey Circus

Fine arts and entertainment 
 William Cole (musician) (1909–1997), English conductor and organist
 Bill Cole (musician) (born 1937), jazz musician, jazz and African American scholar
 Bill Cole (television journalist and producer) (1922–2006), foreign correspondent for CBS News and public television producer

Military and law enforcement 
 William Cole (police officer) (c. 1840–1900), British policeman
 William Carey Cole (1868–1935), U.S. Navy admiral
 William E. Cole (1874–1953), U.S. Army general

Politics
 William Colle  (fl. 1397–1414), MP for Leominster in 1397
 William Cole (planter) (c.1571–1653), English planter, politician and soldier
 William Cole, 1st Earl of Enniskillen (1736–1803), Irish peer and politician
 William Cole, 3rd Earl of Enniskillen (1807–1886), known as Viscount Cole
 William Cole (Australian politician) (1858–1938), South Australian House of Assembly
 William Cole (public servant) (1926–2019), Australian
 William Clay Cole (1897–1965), U.S. Congressman from Missouri
 William H. Cole IV (born 1972), city councilman from Baltimore
 William Hinson Cole (1837–1886), U.S. Congressman from Maryland and Confederate surgeon
 William Purington Cole Jr. (1889–1957), U.S. Congressman from Maryland and judge
 W. Sterling Cole (1904–1987), U.S. Congressman from New York
 William J. Cole, State Treasurer of Mississippi
 Bill Cole (Montana politician), mayor of Billings, Montana, 2017
 Bill Cole (West Virginia politician) (born 1956), Senate

Religion
 William Cole (Dean of Lincoln) (c. 1530–1600), English Puritan clergyman
 William Cole (antiquary) (1714–1782), Cambridgeshire clergyman 
 William Cole (Dean of Waterford) (died 1804)

Sports
 William C. "King" Cole (1881–1968), American college football player and coach
 Billy Cole (footballer) (1909–1958), Australian rules footballer
 Billy Cole (born 1965), English shot putter

Medicine
 William Cole (botanist) (1626–1662), English herbalist
 William Cole (physician) (1635–1716), English physician and medical writer
 William Harder Cole (1892–1967), American Science Educator

Scholars
 William Cole (scholar) (1753–1806), English classical scholar